Naresh Dev Pant, popularly known as Dev Naresh is a Nepalese graphic designer, wall artist, artist and web designer. He is also a freelancer photographer since 2013 to date.

Early life
Since his early days, Naresh was very fond of writing poems. He used to read poems on radio. Naresh finished his schooling from Padmodaya School. He has done various theatre acts as well as TV serials since his young age.

Personal life
Naresh finished his education from Shanker Dev Campus. He studied Master of Business Administration (MBA). He fell in love with Nira Pant and later they got married. Naresh and Nira got married in May of the year 2002, and they have a son "Amurta Dev Pant" and a daughter "Anani Pant".

Career

Lyricist
Naresh's first lyrics were sung by famous Pop Singer Nabin K Bhattarai. The song name was "Bajauda bajaudai". Some of his award winning songs are:

Director/Producer
He has produced different series as well as movies. As a director he has received huge recognition with his short movie "The Job Application" which was screened at Cannes Film Festival. Some of his Movies and Series include:1) Director of short movie "The Job Application" in 20102) Produced the TV Series "Saturday Showcase" from 2010-20113) Producer of upcoming movie "Tata Bye Bye" due to be released in 2015 4) Producer of upcoming movie "Rangeen Manasaya"

He also owns Mauree Entertainment Pvt. Ltd. which was the Distributor of Mary Kom (film) in Nepal (2014).

Radio Presenter
Naresh worked as a radio presenter in Hits FM 91.2 from 2000 to 2008

Actor
Naresh has also worked as an actor in Kathmandu, one of the Nepal Television's most successful shows ever, in 2002.

References



1974 births
Living people
Nepalese designers
Shanker Dev Campus alumni